The South African Railways Class C 4-6-0T of 1879 was a steam locomotive from the pre-Union era in the Colony of Natal.

Between 1879 and 1885, the Natal Government Railways placed thirty-seven  Ten-wheeler type tank steam locomotives in service. Of these, the first seven were built as  Mogul type locomotives and were subsequently modified to a  wheel arrangement. By 1908 they were designated Class G and in 1912, when some of the survivors were assimilated into the South African Railways, they were renumbered and reclassified to Class C. These were the oldest pre-Union locomotives to be classified and renumbered onto the SAR roster.

Origins
In 1875, when the Natal Government took over all the assets of the Natal Railway Company and formed the Natal Government Railways (NGR), two important decisions were made. The first was to extend the tracks inland from Durban to Pietermaritzburg to open up the line into the interior, and to Verulam on the North Coast and Isipingo on the South Coast to serve the growing farming communities up and down the coast from Durban. The second was to convert the railway from broad gauge to Cape gauge to conform to the gauge used by the Cape Government Railways. Apart from eventual compatibility with the Gape's railways, this decision to regauge was probably equally much brought about by the terrain which confronted the new railway in the Natal interior, which would demand heavy grades and tight curves.

The first Cape gauge locomotives of the NGR were seven Class K 2-6-0T engines which had been ordered from Beyer, Peacock and Company in 1877 to meet the expected traffic demands on these new lines. They were built to the same specifications as the engines Durban and Pietermaritzburg, a pair of  locomotives which were built by Kitson and Company for Wythes and Jackson, the contractors who built the line between Durban and Pietermaritzburg.

Manufacturers
These locomotives of 1879 were a development of those first Cape gauge Class K  tank locomotives. These new locomotives were initially often referred to as the K&S Class after their builders, Kitson and Company and Robert Stephenson and Company, until a classification system was introduced by the NGR at some stage between 1904 and 1908 and they were designated the NGR Class G. Altogether 37 were built by these two manufacturers, in six batches between 1879 and 1885.

1879

The first seven of these locomotives were delivered from Kitson in 1879, with works numbers in the range from 2254 to 2258, 2269 and 2270. They were numbered in the range from 8 to 14. Like their predecessor Class K, these seven locomotives were built with a  Mogul type wheel arrangement. They were all soon rebuilt to a  Ten-wheeler type wheel arrangement, probably beginning in 1882, since mention is made in the NGR Annual Report for 1883 of five locomotives of the 1879 order having been rebuilt in this manner during the year covered in the report.

1880

Three more locomotives followed in 1880, also built by Kitson, with works numbers in the range from 2358 to 2360 and numbered in the range from 16 to 18. These three as well as all those which followed, were built with a 4-6-0 Ten-wheeler type wheel arrangement.

1882
Twelve more followed in 1882, of which five were built by Kitson, with works numbers in the range from 2504 to 2508 and numbered in the range from 22 to 26. The rest were built by Robert Stephenson and Company, with works numbers in the range from 2484 to 2490. Their known engine numbers (see table below) indicate that they were not numbered in chronological order and that some of them were allocated numbers from earlier locomotives which may have been withdrawn or renumbered.

1883
Two locomotives were delivered in 1883, built by Stephenson with works numbers 2519 and 2520. Their known numbers also indicate renumbering and gap-filling on the locomotive numbering roster.

1884
Ten locomotives were delivered in 1884, built by Stephenson, with works numbers in the range from 2571 to 2580 and numbered in the range from 32 to 41.

1885
The last three were built by Kitson, with works numbers in the range from 2898 to 2900 and numbered in the range from 42 to 44.

Characteristics

Two small two-axle water tenders with a  wheelbase for use on long runs were supplied by Kitson. Another two-axle tender with a  wheelbase was built in the Durban workshops in 1882, to the design of Locomotive Superintendent William Milne. In contrast to the Cape Government Railways (CGR), where tender locomotives were acquired for mainline work from the outset, the NGR persisted with side-tank locomotives on mainline work in spite of their inherent limited coal and water capacities until 1904.

Modifications
Several modifications were done to many of these locomotives during their years in service. This led to differences between locomotives in one or more of several aspects.
 The sandbox location was either on the running boards or atop the boiler.
 The size and shape of their side-tanks.
 The size and shape of their steam chest inspection covers.
 Longer boilers, which resulted in smokeboxes being relocated further forward.
 Frame lengths, extended forward on the 1879 batch to accommodate the bogie, or extended rearward to accommodate extended footplates.
 Larger coupled wheel diameters.
 Increased operating boiler pressure and, as a result, increased tractive effort.
 Increased coal bunker capacity.

All the locomotives were delivered with Salter safety valves. Photographs show that at some stage Ramsbottom safety valves were installed in addition to the existing Salter valves.

Rebuilding

To 4-6-4T Baltic
Two of these locomotives were rebuilt by G.W. Reid, who was appointed as Locomotive Superintendent of the NGR on 1 July 1893. No. 21 was rebuilt to a 4-6-4T Baltic type wheel arrangement in 1896, for use on the South Coast line. At the time, there was no turning facility at the end of this line and the modification was made to enable the locomotive to run equally well in either direction. This locomotive was later renumbered 39 and designated NGR Class H.

To 4-6-2T Pacific
In 1901, no. 25 was rebuilt to a 4-6-2T Pacific type wheel arrangement. This locomotive was later renumbered 38 and was also designated NGR Class H when a classification system was introduced on the NGR.

Service

Natal Government Railways
In NGR service, the Class G replaced the slightly smaller Beyer, Peacock-built Class K  tank locomotives on mainline trains out of Durban. They were occasionally used with the small four-wheeled tenders to increase their water carrying capacity when they were required to work long distances.

On Wednesday 1 December 1880 during the official opening of the line to Pietermaritzburg, a special train consisting of five carriages and a brake-van worked by Kitson 2-6-0 engine no. 12, all new stock, was run from Durban to Pietermaritzburg. The driver was Harry Hayes with guards Frazer and De Broize. The train conveyed a party of invited guests, including the Mayor of Durban, Town Councillors, several prominent citizens and government officials in addition to Mr David Hunter and other railway officers.

South African Railways
When the Union of South Africa was established on 31 May 1910, the three Colonial government railways (CGR, NGR and Central South African Railways) were united under a single administration to control and administer the railways, ports and harbours of the Union. Although the South African Railways and Harbours came into existence in 1910, the actual classification and renumbering of all the rolling stock of the three constituent railways was only implemented with effect from 1 January 1912.

In 1912, fifteen survivors of the Class G were designated the South African Railways (SAR) Class C and were renumbered in the range from 62 to 76. These were the oldest locomotives to be classified and renumbered onto the SAR roster. All older and several newer locomotive types which were in service at the time, were considered obsolete and were renumbered by having the numeral "0" prefixed to their existing numbers. In SAR service, the Class C locomotives were used as shunting engines until the last one was withdrawn from service in 1940.

Electricity Supply Commission
In post-SAR service, one of the ex 2-6-0T rebuilt locomotives, Kitson works number 2269 of 1879, was sold to the Victoria Falls and Transvaal Power Company soon after Union. The power company later became the Electricity Supply Commission (Eskom). While in Eskom's service, it was named Kitty after its builder, Kitson, and used at Eskom’s power stations and eventually at their Rosherville workshops. The locomotive remained in service with Eskom until the mid-1980s, by which time it had rendered more than 105 years of service. It was declared a heritage object in 1983. The relevant gazette of the South African Heritage Resources Agency (SAHRA), no. 8682 of 29 April 1983, describes it as the oldest working steam locomotive in South Africa and the first to have completed a century of service. Initially earmarked to join the South African Railway Museum's National Collection in the 1970s, it was eventually housed in the private South African National Railway And Steam Museum (SANRASM) collection. This historic locomotive’s current fate is unknown.

Renumbering
The early locomotive numbering practices which were followed on the NGR still remain to be deciphered. It would appear that locomotives which were taken out of mainline service were renumbered into the 500 number range. Number slots which became vacant in this manner or as a result of locomotive withdrawal, sale or scrapping were then re-used, either by being allocated to new locomotives or by wholesale renumbering. The published number lists all appear to be snapshots at a point in time and none appear to present the complete picture. The numbers as listed in the table are from two sources, those presented by D.F. Holland in his publication of 1971 and those presented by R.V. Conyngham in his booklet of 1995. The two sources are indicated in the table headings by "DFH" or "RVC" respectively, with the differences between the two sources shaded yellow.

On two of the three SAR numbers where the Holland and Conyngham lists disagree, the official Classification of S.A.R. Engines with Renumbering Lists issued by the Chief Mechanical Engineer's Office, Pretoria, January 1912 seems to prove Holland correct, as shown shaded green in the Notes column in the table. This official document shows old and new numbers, but not builder's works numbers.

On the third disagreement, historic records show two locomotives which bore the number 47. Here, Conyngham is presumed to be correct, since the locomotive Kitty is known to have been built by Kitson, not Stephenson.

Illustration

References

1060
4-6-0 locomotives
2′C n2t locomotives
Kitson locomotives
Robert Stephenson and Company locomotives
Cape gauge railway locomotives
Railway locomotives introduced in 1879
1879 in South Africa